Ritwick Chakraborty is an Indian actor who works in Bengali cinema. He made his debut with Pagol Premi in 2007. He plays different roles in different sorts of movies, so he is a versatile actor in Bengali Film Industry.

Career 
Chakraborty was associated with Bengali theatre from a very early age. As he grew older he became passionate about acting. After his initial struggle in the Bengali film industry he worked in a few television serials and telefilms. He debuted in the film Pagol Premi.
After which, he appeared in Anjan Dutt's cult film Chalo Let's Go, alongside in 2008, followed by Cross Connection with Rimjhim Mitra, Abir Chatterjee and Payel Sarkar, and Raj Chakraborty's Le Chakka, playing the second lead alongside Dev in 2010. He appeared in six films in 2013, and for Shabdo he won the Filmfare East Best Actor's award in 2014. Chakraborty also produced a 2021 Bengali web series named Birohi.

Filmography

Films

Television & Web
Josh
Kanakanjali
Ek Paloke Ektu Dekha
Kuheli 
Neer Bhanga Jhor
Bandhan
Roilo Pherar Nimontron
Banhisikha 
Neel Simana
Bhor Bristi
Goyenda Ginni As himself
Gora (Web Series) (Hoichoi)
Mukti (Web Series) (ZEE5)
Shabash Feluda (Web Series) (ZEE5)
Abar Proloy (Web Series) (ZEE5)
Gora 2 (Web Series) (Hoichoi)
Mr.Kolketa (Web Series) (Hoichoi)

Awards
 West Bengal Film Journalists' Association Awards (2023)- Best Actor (Critics' Choice) for Ananta [Winner]
 West Bengal Film Journalists' Association Awards (2022)- Best Actor for Binisutoy [Winner] 
 Filmfare Awards East [Winner] (2021)- Best Supporting Actor for Jyeshthoputro (2019) [Winner]
 West Bengal Film Journalists' Association Awards (2020)- Best Actor in a Negetive Role for Vinci Da . [Winner] 
West Bengal Film Journalists' Association Awards (2020) - Best Actor for Nagarkirtan [Nominated]
Filmfare Awards East- Critic's Choice Best Actor Male for Rajlokhi O Srikanto (2019) - [Nominee] (2020)
  West Bengal Film Journalists' Association Awards  (2018) Best Actor for Maacher Jhol (2017)- [Nominee]
Filmfare Awards East(2017)-Best Supporting Actor for Saheb Bibi Golaam (2016) [*Winner*]
  West Bengal Film Journalists' Association Awards  (2017) Best Supporting Actor for Saheb Bibi Golaam (2016)-[*Winner*]
Raindance Film Festival, Jury Prize [Nominee] (2016) Best Actor for The Violin Player (2015)
Filmfare Awards East (2014)- Best Actor for Shabdo (2012) - *[Winner]*
"Sera Bangali" Award (2015) by the Anandabazar Patrika

See also 
 Dev (Bengali actor)
 Kanchan Mullick

References

External links 
 

Living people
Male actors in Bengali cinema
Indian male stage actors
Indian male television actors
1969 births